New Orleans Historic Voodoo Museum is a voodoo museum in New Orleans, United States, which opened in 1972. Its exhibits focus on mysteries, history, and folklore related to the African diaspora religion of Louisiana Voodoo. It is situated between Bourbon and Royal Streets in the centre of the French Quarter.
Although only a small museum, consisting of two rooms, it is one of few museums in the world dedicated entirely to Vodou art. There is a voodoo priest on site giving readings. Separately, the museum also hosts walking tours to the Marie Laveau tomb in the Saint Louis Cemetery and the Congo Square.

References

African-American history in New Orleans
French Quarter
Louisiana Voodoo
Museums in New Orleans
Voodoo art
Religion in New Orleans